Caboolture–Bribie Island Road is a continuous  road route in the Moreton Bay local government area of Queensland, Australia. The route is designated as State Route 85.
It is a state-controlled district road (number 126) rated as a local road of regional significance (LRRS).

Route description
Known as Bribie Island Road it runs east, passing the Caboolture–Beachmere Road exit, and then turns north-east. The road passes the exit to Bestmann Road East as it turns north-east to the Bribie Island Bridge. It crosses to the eastern end of the bridge, where it ends at an intersection with Welsby Parade and Sylvan Beach Esplanade. State Route 85 continues east as Benabrow Avenue.

Land use along the road is mainly rural, but with business and residential developments at each end and in Ningi village.

Road condition
The road is fully sealed, with several sections of dual carriageway. The Queensland Government has a long-term plan to upgrade the entire length of the road to four lanes. The following projects aim to improve the condition of sections of this road.

Old Toorbul Point Road intersection
A project to upgrade the intersection with Old Toorbul Point Road, part of a $30.4 million upgrade strategy, was completed in September 2021.

Regina Avenue intersection
A project to upgrade the intersection with Regina Avenue in Ningi, at a cost of $3 million, was in the pre-construction stage in July 2022.

Duplication between Hickey Road and King Johns Creek
A project to plan the future duplication of the road between Hickey Road and King Johns Creek in Caboolture, part of a $20.95 million upgrade strategy, was expected to be completed in 2022.

Duplication between Old Toorbul Point Road and Saint Road
A project to plan the duplication of the road between Old Toorbul Point Road and Saint Road, part of a $30.4 million upgrade strategy, was in detailed design in July 2022.

Planning for duplicate Bribie Island Bridge
A project for planning and preliminary design of a duplicate Bribie Island Bridge, at a cost of $4 million, is expected to be completed in mid-2024.

History

The Caboolture area was colonised by European people in 1842 when the land around the Moreton Bay penal colony was opened up to free settlers. By the mid-1860s farms had been established and the local pastoralists were experimenting with sugar cane and cotton. Some of these farms may have been to the east, along the line of the present road to Bribie Island.

By 1953 a barge was ferrying motor vehicles from Toorbul Point (now Sandstone Point) to the island, thus greatly increasing the usage of the road from Caboolture. The Bribie Island Bridge was built in 1963, further increasing traffic on the road.

Current usage
Bribie Island now has a large resident population (estimated to exceed 20,000 in June 2021) and is a popular tourist destination. It is likely that many residents commute to Caboolture or Brisbane for work, resulting in the road being very heavily used.

Major intersections
All distances are from Google Maps. The entire road is in the Moreton Bay local government area.

Caboolture–Beachmere Road

Caboolture–Beachmere Road is a state-controlled district road (number 128) rated as a local road of regional significance (LRRS).

A project to provide safety improvements to this road, at a cost of $15.275 million, was to commence detailed design in mid-2022.

See also

 List of road routes in Queensland
 List of numbered roads in Queensland

References

Roads in Queensland